The 1975 Rose Bowl was the 61st edition of the college football bowl game, played at the Rose Bowl in Pasadena, California, on Wednesday, January 1. The fifth-ranked USC Trojans of the Pacific-8 Conference defeated #3 Ohio State Buckeyes of the Big Ten Conference,  in one of the most exciting games in the history of the 

After a touchdown pass with two minutes remaining to draw within a point, USC quarterback Pat Haden passed to Shelton Diggs for a two-point conversion to take the lead. It gave the Trojans the Rose Bowl victory and the UPI coaches poll national title.

This was the third consecutive year for these teams in the Rose Bowl: USC won in 1973, Ohio State in 1974.

Teams

Ohio State Buckeyes

The defending Rose Bowl champs were the nation's top-ranked team for much of the season, until they were upset by Michigan State  at East Lansing on November 9. Two weeks later, the Buckeyes earned the Rose Bowl berth with a  victory over Michigan, when kicker Mike Lantry's last-second field goal attempt sailed 

Ohio State was favored to win the Rose Bowl by six points.

USC Trojans

They won their final four games, the most dramatic being a season-ending  win over #5 Notre Dame in which the Trojans trailed

Scoring summary

First quarter
 USC – Chris Limahelu - 30-yard field goal.

Second quarter
 OSU – Champ Henson - 2-yard run (PAT - Tom Klaban kick)

Third quarter
No scoring

Fourth quarter
 USC – Jim Obradovich 9-yard pass from Pat Haden (PAT - Limahelu kick).
 OSU – Cornelius Greene 3-yard run (PAT - Klaban kick)
 OSU – Klaban - 32-yard field goal.
 USC – J. K. McKay 38-yard pass from Haden (PAT - Haden pass to Shelton Diggs)

Aftermath
Undefeated Oklahoma was the #1 team in the AP poll, but were on probation and ineligible for a bowl game. The UPI poll excluded teams on probation, and after the regular season, the UPI had Alabama first, followed by Ohio State, Michigan, USC, and Auburn. The Trojans' dramatic Rose Bowl win over Ohio State enabled them to leapfrog idle Michigan, and when Notre Dame  upset Alabama in the Orange Bowl, 13–11, USC was voted #1 in the UPI poll. This game marked USC head coach John McKay's eighth and last appearance in the Rose Bowl and his fifth win.

This was the last season in which the Big Ten and Pac-8 conferences allowed just one bowl team each, to the Rose Bowl. Michigan and  twelfth-ranked Michigan State did not participate in this bowl season; USC was the only Pac-8 team in the top twenty of either final poll.

Game notes
 Third straight time the two teams meet in the Rose Bowl.
 Head coach John McKay wins fourth national title.
 McKay ends his Rose Bowl career with a 5–3 record, tying Howard Jones for victories.
 Anthony Davis injured and plays less than 1 quarter.
 Quarterback Pat Haden & split end John McKay, Jr. were named co-MVPs.
 USC kicker Chris Limahelu died of prostate cancer in 2010 at age 59.

References

 

Rose Bowl
Rose Bowl Game
Ohio State Buckeyes football bowl games
USC Trojans football bowl games
Rose Bowl
January 1975 sports events in the United States